Farmington is an unincorporated community and census-designated place in Wharton Township, Fayette County, Pennsylvania, United States. It is also home to Historic Summit Inn Resort, the four-star Nemacolin Woodlands Resort and the New Meadow Run and Spring Valley Bruderhofs, two of a group of international Christian communities with about 200 members in each. As of the 2010 census, the population of Farmington was 767.

Geography
Farmington is located in northeastern Wharton Township at geographical coordinates 39° 48′ 28″ North, 79° 34′ 1″ West (39.807220, -79.566154).

The U.S. Postal Service ZIP code for Farmington is 15437.

Demographics

See also
 Farmington Township, Clarion County, Pennsylvania
 Farmington Township, Tioga County, Pennsylvania
 Farmington Township, Warren County, Pennsylvania
 Mertztown, Pennsylvania, which includes a small village named Farmington

References

External links
 Fort Necessity National Battlefield
 Nemacolin Woodlands Resort & Mystic Rock golf course
 Spring Valley Bruderhof Community
Summit Inn

Census-designated places in Pennsylvania
Census-designated places in Fayette County, Pennsylvania